Reiner Hanschke (9 December 1940 – 30 June 2015) was a German field hockey player. He competed in the men's tournament at the 1964 Summer Olympics.

References

External links
 

1940 births
2015 deaths
German male field hockey players
Olympic field hockey players of the United Team of Germany
Field hockey players at the 1964 Summer Olympics
People from Köthen (Anhalt)
Sportspeople from Saxony-Anhalt